Sylvania Southview High School is a public high school in Sylvania, Ohio.  It is one of two high schools in the Sylvania Schools district, the other being Sylvania Northview High School.

Extracurriculars

Speech and Debate 

Sylvania Southview has a Speech and Debate Team that competes in the National Forensics League. Each year, students compete in District Tournaments to qualify for the National Speech and Debate Tournament, which is held in a different city each year.

Mock Trial 

Sylvania Southview has a Mock Trial program. Their coach, Dennis Lyle, has been coaching for 29 years and has led the school through 8 state championships.

Sylvania Southview has also competed in a world championship at the Empire International Mock Trial Invitational in New York City on October 21, 2013. The team finished as #1 internationally after starting the competition at 35th out of 40 teams. In addition to being state/world champions in the 2013–2014 season, Southview finished 3rd at nationals, out of 46 teams across the country. The Southview Mock Trial Team placed 8th at a global level. They have also competed at Empire Mock Trial, where they finished 7th.

Band and Orchestra 

Orchestra members participate in the Ohio Music Education Association Solo and Ensemble and the Northwest Ohio Regional Orchestra and the Ohio All-State Orchestra. Band members participate in Ohio Music Education Association Solo & Ensemble and their large group contests. Band students have the Marching Band, Concert Band, Symphonic, and/or Jazz band to participate in.

Athletics
The athletics program at Southview is known as the Cougars.  The Cougars are designated as a Division II (B) school and compete in all sports in the Northern Lakes League, with the exception of the boys' ice hockey team, who compete in the Northwest Hockey Conference.

Ohio High School Athletic Association State Championships 

 Football - 2008
 Boys' Cross Country – 1987, 1991, 1992 
 Girls' Cross Country – 1994 
 Cougarettes Dance Team - 2009 (Pom Division), Orange Bowl Halftime in Miami, Florida '11, 2011 (Jazz), and 2012 (Pom and Jazz)

Notable alumni 
 Khary Campbell, former NFL player 
 Eric Kripke, television writer, director, and producer 
 Griff Whalen, former NFL player 
 Charles Latshaw, orchestra conductor, music director of the Grand Junction Symphony Orchestra and the Flagstaff Symphony Orchestra
 Nate Hall, Linebacker for the Tennessee Titans

References

External links
 Official School Website
 District Website
 Southview Baseball Website
 Southview Volleyball Website

High schools in Lucas County, Ohio
Public high schools in Ohio
1976 establishments in Ohio